The Byoryolyokh is a river in Magadan Oblast, Russian Federation. It is a left tributary of the Ayan-Yuryakh of the Kolyma river basin.

The name of the river is based on the Yakut word "Börölöökh" (Бөрөлөөх), referring to a place where there are wolves.

History
The Byoryolyokh was first put on the map in 1891 by Ivan Chersky and for almost four decades it was thought that it was one of the rivers whose confluence formed the Kolyma. However, after a more thorough survey of the region carried out by Sergei Obruchev in 1929 it was established that the two rivers forming the Kolyma are the Ayan-Yuryakh and the Kulu.

Course
The Byoryolyokh has its sources at the northern end of the Okhandya Range and heads southwards below the western slopes of the range.
 After passing by Susuman it heads roughly southwestwards and finally it meets the Ayan-Yuryakh shortly upstream from its confluence with the Kulu.

The river flows across the Upper Kolyma Highlands and is fed primarily by rain and snow. Many stretches freeze to the bottom in the winter. The tributaries of the Byoryolyokh are mostly short.

See also
 List of rivers of Russia

References

External links

Rivers of Magadan Oblast
Tributaries of the Kolyma